Kyela Mjini is an administrative ward and a town in the Kyela district of the Mbeya Region of Tanzania. In 2012  there were 47,389 people in the ward.

References 

Wards of Mbeya Region